Galuppo is a surname. Notable people with the surname include:

Alberto Galuppo (born 1985), Italian footballer
Angela Galuppo, Canadian actress